Olenecamptus is a genus of longhorn beetles of the subfamily Lamiinae.

Species
The genus contains the following species:

 Olenecamptus adlbaueri Bjornstad & Minetti
 Olenecamptus affinis Breuning, 1936
 Olenecamptus albidus Jordan, 1894
 Olenecamptus albovittatus Breuning, 1936
 Olenecamptus anogeissi Gardner, 1930
 Olenecamptus australis Dillon & Dillon, 1948
 Olenecamptus basalis Gahan, 1900
 Olenecamptus beardsleyi Gressitt, 1956
 Olenecamptus bilobus (Fabricius, 1801)
 Olenecamptus blairi Breuning, 1936
 Olenecamptus circulifer Heller, 1923
 Olenecamptus clarus Pascoe, 1859
 Olenecamptus compressipes Fairmaire, 1888
 Olenecamptus cretaceus Bates, 1873
 Olenecamptus detzneri Kriesche, 1926
 Olenecamptus diversemaculatus Breuning, 1938
 Olenecamptus dominus Thomson, 1860
 Olenecamptus duodilloni Gilmour, 1947
 Olenecamptus ethiopicus Breuning, 1977
 Olenecamptus formosanus Pic, 1914
 Olenecamptus fukutomii Hasegawa, 2004
 Olenecamptus giraffa (Breuning, 1938)
 Olenecamptus griseipennis (Pic, 1932)
 Olenecamptus grisescens (Pic, 1939)
 Olenecamptus hebridarum Breuning, 1936
 Olenecamptus hofmanni Quedenfeldt, 1882
 Olenecamptus indianus (Thomson, 1857)
 Olenecamptus indicus (Breuning, 1936)
 Olenecamptus kenyensis Adlbauer, 2010
 Olenecamptus laosensis Breuning, 1956
 Olenecamptus lineaticeps Pic, 1916
 Olenecamptus lumawigi Breuning, 1980
 Olenecamptus macari Lameere, 1892
 Olenecamptus malayensis Dillon & Dillon, 1948
 Olenecamptus mordkovitschi Tsherepanov & Dub., 2000
 Olenecamptus nicobaricus Breuning, 1936
 Olenecamptus nigromaculatus Pic, 1915
 Olenecamptus nubilus Jordan, 1904
 Olenecamptus octomaculatus Breuning, 1940
 Olenecamptus octopustulatus (Motschulsky, 1860)
 Olenecamptus olenus Gahan, 1904
 Olenecamptus optatus Pascoe, 1866
 Olenecamptus palawanus Dillon & Dillon, 1948
 Olenecamptus patrizii Aurivillius, 1928
 Olenecamptus pedongensis Breuning, 1968
 Olenecamptus porcellus Dillon & Dillon, 1948
 Olenecamptus pseudostrigosus Breuning, 1938
 Olenecamptus quadriplagiatus Dillon & Dillon, 1948
 Olenecamptus quietus Pascoe, 1866
 Olenecamptus rhodesianus Dillon & Dillon, 1948
 Olenecamptus riparius Danilevsky, 2011
 Olenecamptus rufus Breuning, 1947
 Olenecamptus sandacanus Heller, 1923
 Olenecamptus sarawakensis Breuning, 1936
 Olenecamptus senegalensis Breuning, 1936
 Olenecamptus serratus Chevrolat, 1835
 Olenecamptus sexplagiatus (Breuning, 1936)
 Olenecamptus shanensis Gilmour, 1952
 Olenecamptus siamensis Breuning, 1936
 Olenecamptus signaticollis Heller, 1926
 Olenecamptus similis Dillon & Dillon, 1948
 Olenecamptus somalius Dillon & Dillon, 1948
 Olenecamptus somereni Gilmour, 1948
 Olenecamptus strigosus Pascoe, 1866
 Olenecamptus subobliteratus Pic, 1923
 Olenecamptus superbus Pic, 1908
 Olenecamptus tagalus Heller, 1923
 Olenecamptus tessellatus Distant, 1898
 Olenecamptus timorensis Franz, 1972
 Olenecamptus triplagiatus Jordan, 1894
 Olenecamptus vittaticollis Heller, 1923
 Olenecamptus zanzibaricus Dillon & Dillon, 1948

References

Dorcaschematini